Gangstar Vegas is an open world action-adventure video game developed by Gameloft Montreal and published by Gameloft. It was released for Android and iOS (iPhone, iPod Touch and iPad) on June 7, 2013. It is the sixth (seventh counting Gangstar City) installment in the Gangstar series; it is preceded by Gangstar Rio: City of Saints and succeeded by Gangstar: New Orleans.

Gangstar Vegas is set in modern-day Las Vegas, Nevada. The story revolves around Jason Malone, a skilled mixed martial arts fighter who is targeted by Frank Veliano after winning in a match. Like games in the Grand Theft Auto series, Gangstar Vegas has elements of driving games and third-person shooters, and features "open-world" gameplay that gives the player more control over their playing experience.

Upon its release, it received mixed reviews from critics and players alike, who criticized the laggy graphics, animation, and the frequent software updates, but praised the music and the extensive use of three-dimensional (3D) graphics, which some players noted as an improvement over the previous main installment's 3D version. It has also been a commercial success, having been downloaded over 100 million times on Android and iOS.

Gameplay
Gangstar Vegas is a third-person open-world action-adventure video game; the graphical perspective is capable of being panned. The game world may be traversed on foot or by vehicle. It is structured similarly to previous games in the series and by extension, to Grand Theft Auto and its numerous "clones". Pedestrians can be killed, primarily in order for the player to get collectibles, and vehicles can be destroyed. The overall game world is much larger, with Gameloft marketing it as "Gangstar'''s largest open world". In addition to the main story missions, players can freely roam and/or partake in several side-activities like gang wars, bank robberies, street racing and underground fighting tournaments. Property management is also present, allowing the player to gain income through businesses acquired during the course of the game. In keeping with the game's Las Vegas theme, casino minigames such as video poker, blackjack and slot machines were also introduced, along with several establishments such as a nightclub and convenience stores. There are over 80 missions consisting of action, shooting, racing, and thefts. The player can join "parties" in the gang wars with flamethrowers, Molotov cocktails, grenade launchers, and many more lethal weapons.

Additional content
A number of software updates were added to Gangstar Vegas after its initial release, among them a Saints Row-esque Gangstar vs. Aliens pack, and a Christmas-themed update adding new clothing and vehicles such as a rocket-powered sleigh. Also, the game has since been released as a free-to-play title, with bonus content available through microtransactions. Its frequent use of updating also received criticism from some fans and critics, who noted the lack of weapons, vehicles, and costumes, and the laggy graphics.

Plot
Professional MMA fighter Jason "the Kid" Malone is bribed by the casino owner and powerful Mafia boss Don Frank Veliano to take a dive in a match against Pietro Holston. Frank told Jason to fall in the fourth round but Pietro falls before Jason can take the dive. As a result, he is chased by Frank and his henchmen before Karen Olsen, the accountant and bodyguard of Vera "Leatherface" Montello, arrives and helps him escape. Jason later works for the Montello queenpin, Karen and Eric (more commonly known as "E-Man"), a pimp and drug maker-dealer, mostly in causing chaos against the Velianos.

Frank and his henchmen later storm Montello's celebration, capturing Jason and forcing him to work for the Velianos, including Benny, Frank's right-hand man, and mayoral candidate Rev. Winston "Preacher" Goodman. Jason steals a boat, a seaplane and a helicopter for the Velianos, alongside fighting the Huevos, a Hispanic street gang. After crashing the Huevos' party, however, Jason finds out that the Velianos have kidnapped Karen and are forcing Vera to hand over her strip club, Fire and Vice, to Frank in exchange for Karen.

Jason helps the Montellos save Karen by stealing wire-tapping devices from a military base and planting it to pinpoint Frank and Karen's position. He later joins Eric and Vera to raid Frank's casino, where Karen is held. They then rescue her and escape Frank's soldiers, but at the cost of Vera sacrificing herself to stop reinforcements, out of remorse for having bribed Pietro to lose the MMA fight.

Enraged by Vera's loss, and the truth that Frank ordered her father's murder, Karen wants Jason out of the Mafia war. Jason saves her again from Veliano, convincing her to accept his help. Karen kisses Jason (it is also possible they make out in Jason's Whiptail, as the scene is faded out) before reclaiming Fire and Vice. Jason later sabotages Frank's villa, and uses the media (the only business in Vegas not controlled by Veliano) to mock the LVPD's incompetence (Frank has also bribed the police).

Finding that Benny has been arrested, Frank seeks to remove him from his system. Jason rescues Benny as Veliano's mob intercepts the police convoy. Benny has photos of Goodman's debauchery, who is then threatened by Jason in order to make the mayoral candidate turn against Frank, otherwise the photos are leaked. Cornered and betrayed, and with the FBI on his tail, Frank tries to flee Las Vegas with his money. Jason confronts him on the Wrecking Ball Hotel Casino Tower (a parody of Stratosphere Las Vegas) with a helicopter, only to have Frank shoot at him, leaking the helicopter's fuel tank in the process. Jason defeats Frank in a fistfight, but the latter pushes the trolley of money onto him, almost making him fall off the building. Jason lights up the petrol and throws it onto Frank, setting the fallen mafia boss on fire and falling to his death, and parachutes onto Karen's Störer (a parody of the Porsche 918 Spyder).

Reception

The game received mixed reviews upon release, earning a score of 61 out of 100 at Metacritic. TouchArcade gave Gangstar Vegas'' four stars out of five in a review, called the game "open-ended, violent, destruction-filled fun" and praised the game's graphics, but criticised the "hit and miss" voice acting, controls and technical issues.

Notes

References

External links
Official site

Gameloft games
Gangstar
2013 video games
2014 video games
2015 video games
2016 video games
Action-adventure games
Action video games
Android (operating system) games
Open-world video games
Video games developed in Canada
Video games set in the Las Vegas Valley
Alien invasions in video games
Video games with downloadable content
IOS games
Free-to-play video games
Organized crime video games
Mixed martial arts video games
North America-exclusive video games
Science fiction video games
Spy video games
Superhero video games
Terrorism in fiction
Video games using Havok
Multiplayer and single-player video games